This is a list of people with the surname Peña.

A 
Aaron Peña (born 1959), member of the Texas House of Representatives
Adahisa Peña (born 1983), Miss Venezuela 2008 beauty pageant winner
Adam de la Peña, American actor, comedy writer, producer, and director
Adela Peña, American violinist best known as a founding member of the Eroica Trio
Aketza Peña (born 1981), Spanish professional road bicycle racer
Alcides Peña (born 1989), Bolivian football striker
Alejandra Peña, Venezuelan politician
Alejandro Peña (born 1959), former Major League Baseball relief pitcher
Alejandro Peña Esclusa (born 1954), Venezuelan leader of the NGO Fuerza Solidaria and president of the NGO UnoAmérica
Alfredo Peña (born 1944), Venezuelan journalist and politician
Álvaro Peña (born 1965), former football striker
Angel Peña (musician) (born 1948), is a composer, musician, singer, and record producer
Ángel Peña (born 1975), Dominican Republican Major League Baseball catcher
Antoni Peña (born 1970), retired Spanish male long-distance runner
Antonio Peña (disambiguation)
Arantxa Peña (born 1972), Spanish actress
Asier Peña Iturria (born 1977), Spanish long track speed skater

B 
Berny Peña (born 1980), Costa Rican football player
Brayan Peña (born 1982), Cuban Major League Baseball catcher

C 
Candela Peña (born 1973), Spanish actress
Carlos Peña (born 1978), Dominican professional baseball first baseman
Carlos Peña (Spanish footballer) (born 1983), Spanish professional footballer
Carlos Alberto Peña (born 1990), Mexican professional footballer
Carlos Peña (singer) (born 1988), Guatemalan singer
Caupolicán Peña (born 1930), former Chilean professional footballer and coach

D 
Daniel Peña (engineer) (born 1948), Spanish industrial engineer
Daniel S. Peña Sr. (born 1945), Hispanic-American businessman from Jacksonville, Florida
Darwin Peña (born 1977), Bolivian football midfielder
Diómedes Peña (born 1976), Colombian football player
Dorian Peña (born 1977), Filipino American professional basketball player

E 
Elizabeth Peña (1959–2014), American actress
Ellen Hart Peña (born 1958), former world-class runner and lawyer
Elvis Peña (born 1974), former Dominican Republican Major League Baseball second baseman
Enrique Peña Nieto (born 1966), former President of Mexico (2012-2018)
Enrique Peña Sánchez (1880–1922), Cuban cornet player, orchestra leader and composer

F 
Fabián Peña (born 1973), Mexican football midfielder
Federico Peña (born 1947), former United States Secretary of Transportation and United States Secretary of Energy
Feliciano Peña (1915–1982), Mexican painter, sculptor and engraver
Félix de la Peña, governor of Córdoba Province, Argentina
Félix Peña (born 1990), Dominican professional baseball pitcher
Florencia Peña (born 1974), Argentine actress
Francisco Peña (c. 1540–1612), Spanish canon lawyer
Francisco Peña Romero (born 1978), Spanish footballer
Frank Peña (born 1971), Mexican-American professional boxer

G 
George de la Peña (born c. 1955), American ballet dancer, musical theatre performer
Gerónimo Peña (born 1967), retired professional baseball second base man
Gonzalo Peña (born 1989), Spanish actor
Guillermo Gómez-Peña (born c.1978), Mexican performance artist, writer, activist, and educator
Gustavo Peña (born 1941), retired Mexican footballer

H 
Hipólito Peña (born 1964), former Dominican Republican Major League Baseball pitcher
Horacio de la Peña (born 1966), Argentinean tennis coach and a former tennis player
Horacio Peña (actor) (born 1936), Argentine actor
Horacio Peña (author) (born 1936), professor, writer, and poet

I 
Ignacio Peña, Puerto Rican singer/songwriter
Iván de la Peña (born 1976), Spanish footballer

J 
Jason de la Pêna (born 1972), English journalist and news presenter
Jennifer Peña (born 1983), three-time Grammy-nominated singer and actress
Jeremy Peña (born 1997), Dominican-American baseball player
Jesús Peña (born 1975), former Dominican Republican relief pitcher in Major League Baseball
Jharome Peña, Filipino professional pool player
Jorge Peña Hen (1928–1973), Chilean composer
José Peña (pitcher) (born 1942), former Mexican pitcher in Major League Baseball
José Peña (sprinter) (born 1979), Venezuelan track and field sprinter
José Peña (steeplechaser) (born 1987), Venezuelan steeplechase athlete
Jose Encarnacion Peña (1902–1979), San Ildefonso Pueblo painter.
José Enrique de la Peña (1807–1840), colonel in the Mexican Army
José María Peña (born 1895), Spanish professional association football player
José Francisco Peña Gómez (1937–1998), politician from the Dominican Republic
Jose Peña Suazo (born 1967), Dominican Republican Latin singer
Juan Manuel Peña (born 1973), Bolivian footballer
Juan Peña (baseball) (born 1977), former Major League Baseball starting pitcher
Julianna Peña (born 1989), mixed martial artist

K 
Karell Peña (born 1989), Cuban beach volleyball player
Kelvin dela Peña (born 1984), Filipino professional basketball athlete

L 
Lorenzo Peña (born 1944), Spanish philosopher, lawyer, logician and political thinker
Louis Angelo Peña (born 1989), Venezuelan footballer
Lucilo de la Peña (born 1921), Cuban Olympic fencer
Luis Peña (1918–1977), Spanish actor
Luis Sáenz Peña (1822–1907), President of Argentina (1892–1895)

M 
Manuel de la Peña y Peña (1789–1850), interim Mexican president September to November 1847 and president January 1848 to June 1848
Manuel la Peña (1808–1811), or Lapeña, Spanish military officer served in the Peninsular War
Marcelo Peña (born 1975), former Chilean professional footballer and coach
Marco Peña, guitarist for the American rock band The Ataris
Mario Peña (1952–2008), Peruvian politician
Marisol Peña (born 1960), Chilean judge
Michael Peña (born 1976), American film and television actor
Miguel Peña (disambiguation), several people
Milenka Peña,  is a popular television and radio journalist and newscaster
Miles Peña, Cuban salsa musician
Miriam Peña Cárdenas, Chilean-Mexican astronomer

N 
Nicolás Rodriguez Peña (1775–1853), Argentine politician

O 
Orlando Peña (musician) (1928–1994), Cuban musician and composer
Orlando Peña (born 1933), former Cuban Major League Baseball pitcher

P 
Pablo Peña (born 1955), former Bolivian football referee
Paco Peña (born 1942), Spanish flamenco guitarist
Pedro Peña (1864–1943), provisional President of Paraguay in 1912

R 
Ralph Peña, founding member and the current artistic director of Ma-Yi Theater Company
Ramiro Peña (born 1985), Mexican Major League Baseball infielder
Ramón María del Valle-Inclán y de la Peña, Marquess de Bradomin, (1866–1936) was a Spanish dramatist, novelist and member of the Spanish Generation of 98
Ramón Peña (born 1962), retired Dominican Republican Major League Baseball relief pitcher
Raymundo Joseph Peña (born 1934), American Roman Catholic bishop
René Peña, Cuban artist specializing in photography
Richard Peña (born 1953), American film program director of the prestigious Film Society of Lincoln Center
Roberto Carlos Peña (born 1984), Colombian footballer
Roberto Peña (1937–1982), former Major League Baseball shortstop
Roque Sáenz Peña (1851–1914), President of Argentina (1910–1914)

T 
Tony Peña (pitcher) (born 1982), Major League Baseball pitcher
Tony Peña Jr. (born 1981), Dominican professional baseball pitcher
Tony Peña (born 1957), former professional baseball player
Tori Pena (born 1987), Irish American pole vaulter

V 
Vicky Peña (born 1954), Catalan television, cinema, theatre and voice actress
Víctor Hugo Peña (born 1974), Colombian professional road racing cyclist

W 
William Merriweather Peña (1919-2018), American architect
Wily Mo Peña (born 1982), former Major League Baseball player

Pena
Pena